V. elegans may refer to:
 Virginia elegans, a synonym for Virginia valeriae, a snake species found in the United States
 Voluta elegans, a synonym for Cryptospira elegans, a sea snail species